John Hotham may refer to:
Sir John Hotham, 1st Baronet (c. 1589–1645), English parliamentarian
John Hotham (bishop) (died 1337), English medieval Chancellor of the Exchequer, Lord High Treasurer, Lord Chancellor and Bishop of Ely
John Hotham, the younger (1610–1645), English Member of Parliament during the Civil War
John Hotham (14th century MP), English Member of Parliament for Yorkshire
John de Hotham (died 1361), English medieval college head and university chancellor
John Hotham (died c.1609), MP for Scarborough and Hedon
Sir John Hotham, 2nd Baronet (1632–1689), English politician who sat in the House of Commons from 1660 to 1685 and in 1689
Sir John Hotham, 3rd Baronet (1655–1691), English politician who sat in the House of Commons from 1689 to 1690
Sir John Hotham, 9th Baronet (1734–1795), English baronet and Anglican clergyman